Salvia atrorubra is a perennial plant that is native to Yunnan province in China, found growing in forests at  elevation.

Inflorescences are 2-flowered verticillasters in axillary and terminal racemes.

Notes

atrorubra
Flora of China